Pedrinhas is a municipality in the state of Sergipe in Brazil. It has an elevation of 165 m.

References

Municipalities in Sergipe